Mountain View Acres is a census-designated place (CDP) in the Victor Valley of the Mojave Desert, within San Bernardino County, California.

Geography
Mountain View Acres is located southwest of Victorville, and north of Hesperia

According to the United States Census Bureau, the CDP has a total area of 1.6 square miles (4.1 km), all land.

Demographics

2010
At the 2010 census Mountain View Acres had a population of 3,130. The racial makeup of Mountain View Acres was 1,748 (55.8%) White (34.6% Non-Hispanic White), 215 (6.9%) African American, 48 (1.5%) Native American, 98 (3.1%) Asian, 17 (0.5%) Pacific Islander, 861 (27.5%) from other races, and 143 (4.6%) from two or more races. Hispanic or Latino of any race were 1,647 persons (52.6%).

The census reported that 3,102 people (99.1% of the population) lived in households, 28 (0.9%) lived in non-institutionalized group quarters, and no one was institutionalized.

There were 906 households, 400 (44.2%) had children under the age of 18 living in them, 534 (58.9%) were opposite-sex married couples living together, 147 (16.2%) had a female householder with no husband present, 88 (9.7%) had a male householder with no wife present.  There were 56 (6.2%) unmarried opposite-sex partnerships, and 1 (0.1%) same-sex married couples or partnerships. 108 households (11.9%) were one person and 50 (5.5%) had someone living alone who was 65 or older. The average household size was 3.42.  There were 769 families (84.9% of households); the average family size was 3.60.

The age distribution was 886 people (28.3%) under the age of 18, 353 people (11.3%) aged 18 to 24, 746 people (23.8%) aged 25 to 44, 790 people (25.2%) aged 45 to 64, and 355 people (11.3%) who were 65 or older.  The median age was 34.3 years. For every 100 females, there were 102.9 males.  For every 100 females age 18 and over, there were 101.3 males.

There were 989 housing units at an average density of 629.5 per square mile, of the occupied units 660 (72.8%) were owner-occupied and 246 (27.2%) were rented. The homeowner vacancy rate was 3.3%; the rental vacancy rate was 4.7%.  2,155 people (68.8% of the population) lived in owner-occupied housing units and 947 people (30.3%) lived in rental housing units.

According to the 2010 United States Census, Mountain View Acres had a median household income of $56,318, with 20.5% of the population living below the federal poverty line.

2000
At the 2000 census there were 2,521 people, 776 households, and 644 families in the CDP. The population density was 1,604.1 inhabitants per square mile (620.0/km). The racial makeup of the CDP was 64.0% White, 10.1% African American, 1.3% Native American, 2.2% Asian, 0.2% Pacific Islander, 16.0% from other races, and 6.2% from two or more races. Hispanic or Latino of any race were 34.4%.

Of the 776 households 39.6% had children under the age of 18 living with them, 62.6% were married couples living together, 14.7% had a female householder with no husband present, and 17.0% were non-families. 13.8% of households were one person and 4.6% were one person aged 65 or older.  The average household size was 3.23 and the average family size was 3.50.

The age distribution was 31.3% under the age of 18, 8.8% from 18 to 24, 26.8% from 25 to 44, 24.0% from 45 to 64, and 9.1% 65 or older.  The median age was 35 years. For every 100 females, there were 98.5 males.  For every 100 females age 18 and over, there were 94.9 males.

The median household income was $45,878 and the median family income  was $52,792. Males had a median income of $36,568 versus $27,321 for females. The per capita income for the CDP was $16,247.  About 2.7% of families and 7.0% of the population were below the poverty line, including 7.5% of those under age 18 and 7.8% of those age 65 or over.

Government

References

Census-designated places in San Bernardino County, California
Populated places in the Mojave Desert
Victor Valley
Census-designated places in California